Amata pembertoni is a moth of the  family Erebidae. It was described by Rothschild in 1910. It is found in Angola.

References

 Natural History Museum Lepidoptera generic names catalog

Endemic fauna of Angola
pembertoni
Moths described in 1910
Moths of Africa